Moneymore railway station in Moneymore, County Londonderry, was on an extension of the Belfast and Ballymena Railway which ran from Cookstown Junction in County Antrim to Cookstown in County Tyrone in Northern Ireland.

History

The station was opened by the Belfast and Ballymena Railway on 10 November 1856. The station buildings were designed by the architect Charles Lanyon.

The station closed to passengers on 28 August 1950.

References 

Disused railway stations in County Londonderry
Railway stations opened in 1856
Railway stations closed in 1950
Railway stations in Northern Ireland opened in the 19th century